Chhatrapati Shivaji, founder of Maratha empire in western India in 1664, was well known for his forts. Many, like Panhala Fort and Rajgad existed before him but others, like Sindhudurg and Pratapgad, were built by him from scratch. Also, the fort of Raigad was built as the place of throne, i.e., the capital, of Maratha Empire by Hirojee Indulkar on the orders of the Chhatrapati. This is the place where Shivaji was crowned and today also his Samadhi (shrine) stands in front of the Jagadishwar temple. These forts were central to his empire and their remains are among the foremost sources of information about his rule. The French missionary Father Fryer witnessed the fortifications of Gingee, Madras, built by Shivaji after its conquest, and appreciated his technical know-how and knowledge.

Sindhudurg was built in order to control attacks by Portuguese and Siddhis on the coastal areas of the Maratha Empire. This fort is the witness of Shivaji's navy which was later led by Kanhoji Angre in times of Shivaji's grandson Shahu I, and came to glory. Also Shivaji built the forts of Colaba and Underi to control the activities of the Siddhis in Arabian Sea. At the time of Underi's construction British opposed a lot and stood with their warships in the sea to obstacle the material being supplied for the construction of the fort. But for their surprise the material required for construction was being supplied with the help of small boats in night.

Over such long distance, hill forts were supported by seaforts. All of these forts were put under a havaldar with a strong garrison. Strict discipline was followed. These forts proved useful during Mughal-Maratha wars.

Notable features of Shivaji's forts include:

Design changes with the topography and in harmony of the contour, no monotony of design.
No ornate palaces or dance floors or gardens.
No temple complexes.
Sanskritization of fort names.
Community participation in the defense of forts
Distinct feature of forts like double line fortification of Pratapgad, citadel of Rajgad.
Foresight in selection of sites.

See also
 List of forts in Maharashtra

References

Shivaji